The Ontario Raiders were a member of the National Lacrosse League during the 1998 NLL season. The franchise was founded as an expansion team in Hamilton, Ontario, and played their home games at Copps Coliseum. Former Buffalo Bandits coach Les Bartley was hired to coach the new team, and he lured former Bandit Jim Veltman to join him, becoming the Raiders' captain. The team finished a respectable 6-6 in their inaugural season, but missed the playoffs on a tie-breaker.  Following the season, losses of $250,000 forced owner Chris Fritz to look for partners.  Maple Leaf Sports & Entertainment considered purchasing the team, but ultimately a group which included Bill Watters, the then Assistant General Manager of the Toronto Maple Leafs, Paul Beeston, former president of the Toronto Blue Jays, Tie Domi, player for the Maple Leafs, and Bobby Orr, former NHL player, bought it for $250,000 and promptly relocated the team to Toronto's Maple Leaf Gardens where they rebranded it the Toronto Rock.

Awards and honours

Famous players
Bob Watson
Colin Doyle
Jim Veltman
Mike Accursi

Team roster

Records

References

 
Defunct National Lacrosse League teams
Sports teams in Hamilton, Ontario
Lacrosse teams in Ontario
1998 establishments in Ontario
1998 disestablishments in Ontario
Lacrosse clubs established in 1998
Lacrosse clubs disestablished in 1998